The first series of MasterChef New Zealand was judged by Simon Gault, Ross Burden and Ray McVinnie. Brett McGregor and Kelly Young competed in the final showdown with Brett emerging as the first New Zealand MasterChef.

Elimination Chart

 This Contestant Won The Competition.
 This Contestant Was The Runner-up.
 This Contestant Won The Elimination Challenge.
 This Contestant Was In The Bottom 2.
 This Contestant Was In the Winning Team.
 This Contestant Was Eliminated.

Contestants

References 

Series 1
2010 New Zealand television seasons